Buckley & Taylor was a British engineering company that manufactured stationary steam engines. It was the largest firm of engine makers in Oldham, Lancashire, England. The company produced large steam-driven engines for textile mills in Oldham and exported to India, Holland and Brazil.

History
Buckley & Taylor started business in 1861, and were producing mill engines by 1867. Many of their early engines were large compound beam engines. By 1870 they had established a reputation for horizontal twin tandem compounds. In 1890 they were employing 400 men. They built their last engine in 1926. Through Buckley, the firm had a close relationship with the Oldham Boiler Works Ltd.

Samuel Buckley was born in 1837 at Hey, Lees, to a mule spinner. He started work in a mill at the age of six. While working he got an education and studied engineering. Before he was twenty he had been appointed chief engineer at Castle Mill and Lowerhouse Mill. He had an interest in politics and was Mayor of Oldham  on three occasions: 1883/4 1889/90 and 1890/1. James Taylor was born in 1838 at Shaw, and served an apprenticeship with Woolstenhulmes & Rye. Both men were engineers, though it was Taylor who dealt with the practical details, and Buckley conducted the commercial side of the business. On Taylor's death, Buckley managed the business alone. It was incorporated in 1902; and Taylor's son William took control. It was taken over by the Brightside Foundry, general engineers of Sheffield in 1947, but continued to operate under its own name.

Horizontal twin tandem 
These were 'standard' mill engines preferred by the Oldham Limiteds. An early example was the 1,000-ihp engine delivered to the North Moor spinning company in 1876. The design was conservative, using slide valves and spur wheel gear drive transmission. They did start to fit Corliss valves and rope drives in 1883, but these didn't become standard until the 1890s. An example of such an engine was the 2,000-ihp, horizontal twin tandem triple expansion delivered to Pearl Mill in 1892.

Beam Engines
During the 1890s Buckley & Taylor revived the beam engine, building at least 11 engines using designs of JH Tattersall, a consulting engineer from Preston. The two identical engines, twin beam triple expansion engines, built for  Nile Mill and Tay Mill were the biggest ever beam engine installed in a cotton mill. They delivered 2,500 ihp and cost over £10,000

Marine type mill engines 
Inverted vertical engines, known commonly as marine type engines, needed less space to operate. From about 1899 Buckley & Taylor started to specialise in this type of engine. Starting with an engine for Don Mill, Middleton, they built 29 of these engines from 1899 to 1916 with a total capacity of 33,000 ihp. They provided a marine type vertical triple expansion engines to Regent Mill, Failsworth, in 1906. It was the largest they built; with 1,800 installed horsepower. The engine had a  low-pressure cylinder. It was sometimes loaded to 2,000 ihp. It ran until 1958, when it was scrapped. It ran 60,000 spindles. There was a  flywheel, 26 ropes operated at 64 rpm.

Mills driven by their engines
Between 1861 and 1926 Buckley & Taylor built more than 200 mill engines with a total capacity of over 160,000 ihp. Arthur Roberts details 26 in his black book. This list is representative rather than complete.
Sun Mill, Chadderton.1867
Lees & Wrigley No.3. Mill, Glodwick 1875
Pearl Mill, Oldham 1878
Nile Mill
Tay Mill
Don Mill, Middleton 1901
Regent Mill, Failsworth 1906
Orb Mill, Waterhead 1908
Wye No.2 Mill, Shaw 1926

References

Notes

Bibliography

External links
English Heritage Photographs George Watkins Collection

Industrial Revolution
Companies based in Oldham
Steam engine manufacturers
Engineering companies of the United Kingdom
1861 establishments in England
British companies established in 1861